UFC Fight Night: Shevchenko vs. Carmouche 2 (also known as UFC Fight Night 156 or UFC on ESPN+ 14) was a mixed martial arts event produced by the Ultimate Fighting Championship that took place on August 10, 2019 at Antel Arena in Montevideo, Uruguay.

Background
The event marked the promotion's first visit to Uruguay.

A UFC Women's Flyweight Championship bout between current champion Valentina Shevchenko and former UFC Women's Bantamweight Championship challenger Liz Carmouche headlined the event. The pairing met previously under a regional promotion banner in 2010 with Carmouche winning the first bout via second-round TKO (doctor stoppage).

A light heavyweight bout between former UFC Light Heavyweight Championship challenger Volkan Oezdemir and Ilir Latifi was originally scheduled for June 1 at UFC Fight Night: Gustafsson vs. Smith. However, the bout was canceled after Latifi pulled out two days before the event due to a back injury and then rescheduled for UFC on ESPN: Covington vs. Lawler. In turn, the bout was then shifted to this event a week later after Oezdemir was faced with alleged visa issues which affected his travel schedule.

A lightweight bout between Rafael Fiziev and Alex da Silva Coelho was scheduled for the event. However, it was reported on July 24 that Fiziev had broken his foot and was forced to pull out of the event. He was replaced by promotional newcomer Kazula Vargas.

A flyweight bout between Veronica Macedo and Rachael Ostovich was scheduled for the event. However, it was announced on July 29 that Ostovich was replaced by Polyana Viana for an undisclosed reason.

A welterweight bout between Laureano Staropoli and Alexey Kunchenko was scheduled for the event. However, it was announced on July 29 that Staropoli was forced to pull out of the fight due to a broken nose and was replaced by Gilbert Burns.

A flyweight bout between Ashlee Evans-Smith and Taila Santos was expected for the event. However, Evans-Smith withdrew the bout for an undisclosed reason and was replaced by promotional newcomer Ariane Carnelossi. In turn, it was reported on July 29 that Santos was forced to pull out of the bout due to a wrist injury. No replacement could be found for Santos, thus the bout was cancelled.

Results

Bonus awards
The following fighters received $50,000 bonuses.
Fight of the Night: Vicente Luque vs. Mike Perry
Performance of the Night: Volkan Oezdemir and Veronica Macedo

See also 

 List of UFC events
 2019 in UFC
 List of current UFC fighters

References 

UFC Fight Night
2019 in mixed martial arts
Mixed martial arts in Uruguay
Sports competitions in Montevideo